{{DISPLAYTITLE:C12H12O4}}
The molecular formula C12H12O4 (molar mass: 220.22 g/mol, exact mass: 220.0736 u) may refer to:

 Eugenitin
 Hispolon
 Siderin